All 18 UCI ProTeams are invited automatically and obligated to attend, with nine cyclists per team. UCI rules normally limit races to a peloton of 200 riders, but the Giro received special dispensation for a 207-rider peloton, allowing a 23rd team. Despite talk that ProTeam  might be excluded to the doping scandals involving team members Riccardo Riccò and Ezequiel Mosquera, they were included pursuant to UCI rules.

The cyclists wore numbers from 1 to 229; the first team had numbers 1 to 9, the second team 11 to 19, etc.

By rider 

‡ Died as a result of a collision

By nationality

References

External links 

cyclingnews.com

2011 Giro d'Italia
2011